Steve Meister (born April 21, 1958) is a former professional tennis player from the United States. Meister's highest singles ranking was World No. 69, which he reached in August 1984. During his career, he won 8 doubles titles and achieved a career-high doubles ranking of World No. 20 in July 1984.

Meister was born in New York City, and is Jewish. He graduated from Princeton University in 1980 with a degree in Civil Engineering. He turned professional in May 1980, and retired in 1986.

He then founded Meister Financial Group, Inc. in  1987 as a wholesale mortgage lending corporation. He served as the U.S. Men’s Tennis Coach of the 1989 Maccabiah Games and the 1993 Maccabiah Games. He received a Master of Science in Finance in 2004 from Florida International University.

He was elected to the Miami-Dade County Hall of Fame in 2005.

Career finals

Doubles (6 titles, 3 runner-ups)

References

External links
 
 

American male tennis players
Jewish American sportspeople
Jewish tennis players
Sportspeople from New York City
Princeton Tigers men's tennis players
Tennis players from Miami
Tennis people from New York (state)
Living people
1958 births
Florida International University alumni
21st-century American Jews